Hechler is a German surname. Notable people with the surname include:

 William Hechler (1845–1931), English Anglican priest
 Ken Hechler (1914-2016), American politician

See also 
 Hechler forcing
 Heckling (disambiguation)
 Heckle (disambiguation)
 Heckler (disambiguation)

German-language surnames